Trechus pseudoalyshensis is a species of ground beetle in the subfamily Trechinae. It was described by Deuve & Queinnec in 1992.

References

pseudoalyshensis
Beetles described in 1992